Rotopouri is a lake close to Kaipara Harbour in the north of New Zealand's Northland Region.

See also
List of lakes in New Zealand

References

Lakes of the Northland Region
Kaipara District